The 1998 United States Senate election in Oklahoma was held November 3, 1998. Incumbent Republican U.S. Senator Don Nickles won re-election to his fourth and final term. Nickles won in a landslide, carrying all but one of the 77 counties in the state. The sole county Democratic candidate Don Carroll won was Haskell County.

Major candidates

Democratic 
 Don Carroll, air conditioning repairman

Republican 
 Don Nickles, incumbent U.S. Senator

Results

See also 
 1998 United States Senate elections

References 

United States Senate
Oklahoma
1998